Michael Hardt (born 1960) is an American political philosopher and literary theorist. Hardt is best known for his book Empire, which was co-written with Antonio Negri. 

Hardt and Negri suggest that several forces which they see as dominating contemporary life, such as class oppression, globalization and the commodification of services (or production of affects), have the potential to spark social change of unprecedented dimensions. A sequel, Multitude: War and Democracy in the Age of Empire was published in August 2004. It outlines an idea first propounded in Empire, which is that of the multitude as possible locus of a democratic movement of global proportions. The third and final part of the trilogy, Commonwealth, was published in 2009.

Early life and education
Hardt attended Winston Churchill High School in Potomac, Maryland. He studied engineering at Swarthmore College in Pennsylvania from 1978 to 1983. In college during the 1970s energy crisis, he began to take an interest in alternative energy sources. Talking about his college politics, he said,  "I thought that doing alternative energy engineering for third world countries would be a way of doing politics that would get out of all this campus political posing that I hated. It seemed that way, but I was quickly disabused."

During college, he worked for various solar energy companies. Hardt also participated, after college, in the Sanctuary Movement and later helped establish a project to bring donated computers from the United States and put them together for the University of El Salvador. Yet, he says that this political activity did more for him than it did for the Salvadorans.

In 1983, he moved to Seattle to study comparative literature at the University of Washington. While working on his PhD, Hardt began to translate Antonio Negri's book on Baruch Spinoza, The Savage Anomaly, in order to come into contact with him. He first met Negri in Paris in the summer of 1986 to discuss translation difficulties. After their meeting, Hardt decided to complete his graduate exams and move to Paris the following summer. He received an M.A. in 1986 and completed his dissertation on Gilles Deleuze in 1990, with which he earned his PhD.

After briefly teaching at the University of Southern California, Hardt began teaching in the Literature Program at Duke University in 1994. He is currently professor of Literature and Italian at Duke.

Thought
Hardt is concerned with the joy of political life, and has stated, "One has to expand the concept of love beyond the limits of the couple." The politics of the multitude is not solely about controlling the means of productivity or liberating one's own subjectivity. These two are also linked to love and joy of political life and realizing political goals.

Hardt does not consider teaching a revolutionary occupation, nor does he think the college is a particularly political institution. "But thinking of politics now as a project of social transformation on a large scale, I'm not at all convinced that political activity can come from the university."

Hardt says visions of a public education and equal and open access to the university are gradually disappearing: the "war on terror" has promoted only limited military and technological knowledges, while the required skills of the biopolitical economy, "the creation of ideas, images, code, affects, and other immaterial goods" are not yet recognized as the primary key to economic innovation. Many of Hardt's works have been co-written with Antonio Negri.

Occupation movements of 2011–2012

In May 2012 Hardt and Negri self-published an electronic pamphlet on the occupation and encampment movements of 2011-2012 called Declaration that argues the movement explores new forms of democracy.

Publications

Books
Gilles Deleuze: an Apprenticeship in Philosophy, 1993
Labor of Dionysus: a Critique of the State-form, with Antonio Negri, 1994
Empire, with Antonio Negri, 2000
Multitude: War and Democracy in the Age of Empire, with Antonio Negri, 2004
Commonwealth, with Antonio Negri, 2009
Declaration, with Antonio Negri, 2012
Assembly, with Antonio Negri, 2017

Selected Articles

Film appearances
 Marx Reloaded, Arte, April 2011.
 Examined Life, Sphinx Productions, 87 min., 2008.
 Antonio Negri: A Revolt that Never Ends, ZDF/Arte, 52 min., 2004.

References

Works Cited
Hardt, Michael, Caleb Smith, and Enrico Minardi. "The Collaborator and the Multitude: An Interview with Michael Hardt." The Minnesota Review 61-62 (Spring/Summer 2004). 63–77. 
Hardt, Michael. "How to Write With Four Hands." Genre 46.2 (2013). 175–182.
Vulliamy, Ed. "Empire hits back". The Guardian, Sunday 15 July 2001.
  Full text.

External links

Michael Hardt at Duke University
  Full text pdf.
Interview/podcast with Michael Hardt about what role revolutions have today as spaces for new social creation  Radio Web MACBA, 2014.

1960 births
Living people
People from Bethesda, Maryland
People from Potomac, Maryland
Autonomism
American Marxists
American political philosophers
American communists
American literary critics
Imperialism studies
Marxist theorists
Libertarian Marxists
Libertarian socialists
Duke University faculty
Academic staff of European Graduate School
Swarthmore College alumni
University of Washington alumni
20th-century American writers
21st-century American non-fiction writers
20th-century American philosophers
21st-century American philosophers
Continental philosophers
Critics of work and the work ethic